The Battle of Foulksmills, known locally as the Battle of Horetown and also known as the Battle of Goff's Bridge, was a battle on 20 June 1798 between advancing British forces seeking to stamp out the rebellion in County Wexford during the Irish Rebellion of 1798 and a rebel army assembled to oppose them. The rebel army failed to stop the British.

Background
By 19 June the threat of the United Irish rebellion spreading outside county Wexford had been largely contained and Crown forces were positioned to move against rebel held territory. A force of about 2,500 men under Sir John Moore moved out of New Ross towards Wexford as part of an overall encirclement operation in conjunction with General Gerard Lake's forces moving from the north.

Moore moves out
Moore's force was to link up and combine with the isolated garrison holding Duncannon before moving deeper into County Wexford, but after waiting several hours with no sign of their arrival, Moore decided to press ahead to the village of Taghmon alone. Upon nearing Goffs Bridge at Foulkesmill, his scouts reported a rapidly moving rebel force of some 3,000 moving quickly along the road with the intent to give battle. Moore despatched a force of riflemen from the 60th Regiment to hold the bridge until artillery could be brought up in support.

The battle
The rebels however, led by Father Philip Roche, spotted this move and moved away from the road to the high ground on the left intending to outflank Moore's force. The 60th were forced to engage the rebels on the roads, fields and forests of the area and the rebel flanking move briefly threatened to overturn Moore's left. Moore had to personally rally his fleeing troops to hold the line and led them in a successful counter-attack. As more troops began to arrive the rebels were flushed out of their concealed positions, allowing the artillery to be brought into play and the rebels' move was foiled. The rebels were gradually pushed back field by field but were able to withdraw the bulk of their force safely.

Results
The road to Wexford was opened and the town recaptured by the Crown the next day, but during this battle, followers of rebel captain Thomas Dixon massacred between 35-100 (estimates vary) loyalist prisoners at Wexford bridge. 

Casualties are estimated at roughly 300 on both sides.

Sources

"The Peoples Rising -Wexford in 1798" (1995) - Daniel Gahan 
"Ireland 1798: The Battles" - Art Kavanagh, 

Fouksmills
Foulksmills